Hartford Township is a civil township of Van Buren County in the U.S. state of Michigan. The population was 3,274 at the 2010 census. The City of Hartford is located within the township, but is administratively autonomous.

Geography

Demographics
As of the census of 2000, there were 3,159 people, 1,095 households, and 830 families residing in the township. The racial makeup of the township was 87.05% White, 0.47% African American, 1.20% Native American, 0.22% Asian, 8.90% from other races, and 2.15% from two or more races. Hispanic or Latino of any race were 15.51% of the population.

There were 1,095 households, out of which 37.3% had children under the age of 18 living with them, 60.4% were married couples living together, 10.0% had a female householder with no husband present, and 24.2% were non-families. 20.1% of all households were made up of individuals, and 7.0% had someone living alone who was 65 years of age or older.  The average household size was 2.78 and the average family size was 3.17.

In the township the population was spread out, with 28.9% under the age of 18, 8.2% from 18 to 24, 28.5% from 25 to 44, 24.1% from 45 to 64, and 10.3% who were 65 years of age or older.  The median age was 35 years. For every 100 females, there were 109.1 males.  For every 100 females age 18 and over, there were 102.8 males.

The median income for a household in the township was $35,741, and the median income for a family was $39,830. Males had a median income of $31,588 versus $21,324 for females. The per capita income for the township was $14,801.  About 10.2% of families and 12.8% of the population were below the poverty line, including 16.1% of those under age 18 and 5.4% of those age 65 or over.

Notable people

References

Townships in Van Buren County, Michigan
Kalamazoo–Portage metropolitan area
Townships in Michigan